Halichoeres, commonly called wrasses, are a genus of fishes in the family Labridae found in the Atlantic, Indian and Pacific Oceans.

Species
There are currently 80 recognized species in this genus:

 Halichoeres adustus (C. H. Gilbert, 1890) (Black wrasse)
 Halichoeres aestuaricola W. A. Bussing, 1972 (Mangrove wrasse)
 Halichoeres argus (Bloch & J. G. Schneider, 1801) (Argus wrasse)
 Halichoeres bathyphilus (Beebe & Tee-Van, 1932) (Green-band wrasse)
 Halichoeres bicolor (Bloch & J. G. Schneider, 1801) (Pearly-spotted wrasse)
 Halichoeres binotopsis (Bleeker, 1849) (Saowisata wrasse)
 Halichoeres biocellatus L. P. Schultz, 1960 (Red-lined wrasse)
 Halichoeres bivittatus (Bloch, 1791) (Slippery dick)
 Halichoeres bleekeri (Steindachner & Döderlein (de), 1887)
 Halichoeres brasiliensis (Bloch, 1791) (Brazilian wrasse)
 Halichoeres brownfieldi (Whitley, 1945) (Brownfield's wrasse)
 Halichoeres burekae Weaver & L. A. Rocha, 2007 (Mardi Gras wrasse)
 Halichoeres caudalis (Poey, 1860) (Painted wrasse)
 Halichoeres chierchiae di Caporiacco, 1948 (Wounded wrasse)
 Halichoeres chlorocephalus Kuiter & J. E. Randall, 1995 (Green-head wrasse)
 Halichoeres chloropterus (Bloch, 1791) (Pastel-green wrasse)
 Halichoeres chrysotaenia (Bleeker, 1853) (Indian Ocean pinstriped wrasse) 
 Halichoeres chrysus J. E. Randall, 1981 (Canary wrasse)
 Halichoeres claudia J. E. Randall & L. A. Rocha, 2009 (Claudia's wrasse)
 Halichoeres cosmetus J. E. Randall & M. M. Smith, 1982 (Adorned wrasse)
 Halichoeres cyanocephalus (Bloch, 1791) (Yellow-cheek wrasse)
 Halichoeres dimidiatus (Agassiz, 1831)
 Halichoeres discolor W. A. Bussing, 1983 (Cocos wrasse)
 Halichoeres dispilus (Günther, 1864) (Chameleon wrasse)
 Halichoeres erdmanni  J. E. Randall & G. R. Allen, 2010 (Erdmann's wrasse) 
 Halichoeres garnoti (Valenciennes, 1839) (Yellow-head wrasse)
 Halichoeres gurrobyi Victor, 2016 (Black-saddle wrasse) 
 Halichoeres hartzfeldii (Bleeker, 1852) (Hartzfeld's wrasse)
 Halichoeres hilomeni J. E. Randall & G. R. Allen, 2010 (Hilomen's wrasse) 
 Halichoeres hortulanus (Lacépède, 1801) (Checker-board wrasse)
 Halichoeres insularis G. R. Allen & D. R. Robertson, 1992 (Socorro wrasse)
 Halichoeres iridis J. E. Randall & M. M. Smith, 1982
 Halichoeres kallochroma (Bleeker, 1853) (Pink-snout wrasse)
 Halichoeres lapillus J. L. B. Smith, 1947 (Jewelled wrasse)
 Halichoeres leptotaenia J. E. Randall & Earle, 1994
 Halichoeres leucoxanthus J. E. Randall & M. M. Smith, 1982 (Canary-top wrasse)
 Halichoeres leucurus (Walbaum, 1792) (Grey-head wrasse)
 Halichoeres maculipinna (J. P. Müller & Troschel, 1848) (Clown wrasse)
 Halichoeres malpelo G. R. Allen & D. R. Robertson, 1992 (Malpelo wrasse)
 Halichoeres margaritaceus (Valenciennes, 1839) (Pink-belly wrasse)
 Halichoeres marginatus Rüppell, 1835 (Dusky wrasse)
 Halichoeres melanochir Fowler & B. A. Bean, 1928 (Orange-fin wrasse)
 Halichoeres melanotis (C. H. Gilbert, 1890) (Golden wrasse)
 Halichoeres melanurus (Bleeker, 1851) (Tail-spot wrasse)
 Halichoeres melas J. E. Randall & Earle, 1994
 Halichoeres melasmapomus J. E. Randall, 1981 (Cheek-spot wrasse)
 Halichoeres miniatus (Valenciennes, 1839) (Circle-cheek wrasse)
 Halichoeres nebulosus (Valenciennes, 1839) (Nebulous wrasse)
 Halichoeres nicholsi (D. S. Jordan & C. H. Gilbert, 1882) (Spinster wrasse)
 Halichoeres nigrescens (Bloch & J. G. Schneider, 1801) (Bubble-fin wrasse)
 Halichoeres notospilus (Günther, 1864) (Banded wrasse)
 Halichoeres orientalis J. E. Randall, 1999
 Halichoeres ornatissimus (A. Garrett, 1863) (Ornamented wrasse)
 Halichoeres pallidus Kuiter & J. E. Randall, 1995 (Pale wrasse)
 Halichoeres papilionaceus (Valenciennes, 1839) (Weed wrasse)
 Halichoeres pardaleocephalus (Bleeker, 1849) (Line-blotch wrasse)
 Halichoeres pelicieri J. E. Randall & M. M. Smith, 1982
 Halichoeres penrosei Starks, 1913
 Halichoeres pictus (Poey, 1860) (Rainbow wrasse)
 Halichoeres podostigma (Bleeker, 1854) (Axil-spot wrasse)
 Halichoeres poeyi (Steindachner, 1867) (Black-ear wrasse)
 Halichoeres prosopeion (Bleeker, 1853) (Two-tone wrasse)
 Halichoeres radiatus (Linnaeus, 1758) (Pudding-wife wrasse)
 Halichoeres richmondi Fowler & B. A. Bean, 1928 (Richmond's wrasse)
 Halichoeres rubricephalus Kuiter & J. E. Randall, 1995 (Red-head wrasse)
 Halichoeres rubrovirens L. A. Rocha, Pinheiro & Gasparini, 2010 
 Halichoeres salmofasciatus G. R. Allen & D. R. Robertson, 2002 (Red-striped wrasse)
 Halichoeres sazimai O. J. Luiz, C. E. L. Ferreira & L. A. Rocha, 2009
 Halichoeres scapularis (E. T. Bennett, 1832) (Zigzag wrasse)
 Halichoeres semicinctus (Ayres, 1859) (Rock wrasse)
 Halichoeres signifer J. E. Randall & Earle, 1994
 Halichoeres socialis J. E. Randall & Lobel, 2003
 Halichoeres solorensis (Bleeker, 1853) (Green wrasse)
 Halichoeres stigmaticus J. E. Randall & M. M. Smith, 1982 (U-spot wrasse)
 Halichoeres tenuispinis (Günther, 1862)
 Halichoeres timorensis (Bleeker, 1852) (Timor wrasse)
 Halichoeres trimaculatus (Quoy & Gaimard, 1834) (Three-spot wrasse)
 Halichoeres trispilus J. E. Randall & M. M. Smith, 1982 (Triple-spot wrasse)
 Halichoeres zeylonicus (E. T. Bennett, 1833) (Gold-stripe wrasse)
 Halichoeres zulu J. E. Randall & D. R. King, 2010  (KwaZulu-Natal wrasse)

References

 
Labridae
Marine fish genera
Taxa named by Eduard Rüppell